Our Ill Wills is the second album by Stockholm-based Indie pop/rock band Shout Out Louds. It was released on 25 April 2007 in Sweden and was released by the end of May in several European countries. The United States version was released on 11 September 2007. The first single was "Tonight I Have to Leave It", released on 9 April 2007 in Sweden.

The album was produced by Björn Yttling, singer, bassist and keyboard-player of the Swedish Indie pop band Peter Bjorn and John.

The cover art features the band and album names spelled out in international maritime signal flags.

This album features more vocals from Bebban Stenborg who is usually backing Adam Olenius. She sings the entire of "Blue Headlights".

Track listing

Singles
"Tonight I Have to Leave It", released April 9, 2007
"Impossible", released April 8, 2008

External links

2007 albums
Shout Out Louds albums
Albums produced by Björn Yttling